Francesco Vincenzi (born 30 September 1956 in Bagnolo Mella) is an Italian professional football coach and a former player, who played as a forward.

Career

Player 
He played 8 seasons (108 games, 14 goals) in the Serie A for A.C. Milan, Vicenza Calcio, Bologna F.C. 1909, A.S. Roma and Ascoli Calcio 1898. He won the Coppa Italia with Milan in 1977 and with Roma in 1984. During the latter season, he also played for Roma in the 1983–84 European Cup, scoring a goal against IFK Göteborg, as the club went on to reach the final, only to lose out to Liverpool on penalties.

Coach 
During the 2010–11 season, he was the head coach of Carpenedolo in Serie D.

Honours
Milan
 Coppa Italia winner: 1976–77.

Roma
 Coppa Italia winner: 1983–84.

External links
Profile at Enciclopediadelcalcio.it

1956 births
Living people
Italian footballers
Serie A players
A.C. Milan players
A.C. Monza players
L.R. Vicenza players
Bologna F.C. 1909 players
Brescia Calcio players
U.S. Pistoiese 1921 players
A.S. Roma players
Ascoli Calcio 1898 F.C. players
U.S. Lecce players
Como 1907 players
S.S.D. Varese Calcio players
Italian football managers
S.S.D. Pro Sesto managers
Association football forwards